Roberto Gutiérrez Díaz (born 15 March 1991), known simply as Roberto, is a Spanish footballer who plays as a goalkeeper for CD Guijuelo.

Club career
Born in Santa Cruz de Tenerife, Canary Islands, Roberto finished his youth career with local club CD Tenerife, making his senior debut with their reserves in 2010–11 season, in the Tercera División. He was promoted to the first team in the summer of 2012, appearing twice during the campaign as they achieved promotion from the Segunda División B.

Roberto played his first game as a professional on 19 October 2013, starting in a 1–0 Segunda División away win over SD Ponferradina. He subsequently became first choice for the Álvaro Cervera-led side, replacing longtime incumbent Sergio Aragoneses.

On 29 July 2016, Roberto signed with fellow second-division CD Mirandés as a free agent. After 21 competitive matches he returned to the third tier, representing CE Sabadell FC and CD Calahorra. 

Roberto then moved to the Segunda Federación, where he appeared for UD San Fernando, CD Toledo and CD Guijuelo.

References

External links

1991 births
Living people
Spanish footballers
Footballers from Santa Cruz de Tenerife
Association football goalkeepers
Segunda División players
Segunda División B players
Tercera División players
Segunda Federación players
CD Tenerife B players
CD Tenerife players
CD Mirandés footballers
CE Sabadell FC footballers
CD Calahorra players
CD Toledo players
CD Guijuelo footballers